Ethan Greenidge (born September 10, 1997) is an American football offensive tackle for the New Orleans Saints of the National Football League (NFL). He played college football at Villanova.

College career
Greenidge was a member of the Villanova Wildcats for four seasons. He became a starter at tackles midway through his freshman year. Greenidge finished his collegiate career with 43 consecutive games started and was named second-team All-Colonial Athletic Association as a junior and as a senior.

Professional career

Greenidge was signed by the New Orleans Saints as an undrafted free agent on April 27, 2019. He made the Saints' 53-man roster out of training camp but did not play in any games and was listed inactive for the entire season. Greenidge made the active roster again in 2020 and made his NFL debut on September 13, 2020 in the season opener against the Tampa Bay Buccaneers.

On August 24, 2021, Greenidge was placed on injured reserve. He was placed on injured reserve again on August 15, 2022.

References

External links
Villanova Wildcats bio
New Orleans Saints bio

Living people
American football offensive tackles
Villanova Wildcats football players
New Orleans Saints players
Players of American football from New York (state)
1997 births